Nebojša Popović (8 February 1923 – 20 October 2001) was a Serbian basketball player, coach and administrator. He represented the Yugoslavia national basketball team internationally. He is the basketball legend of Red Star Belgrade. In 2007, he was enshrined as a contributor in the FIBA Hall of Fame.

Early life 
Popović lived with his family in Rijeka, where he played water polo as a goalkeeper. He learned about basketball from the Yugoslav water polo and a basketball pioneer Božo Grkinić.

Basketball career

Crvena zvezda 
Popović was a co-founder of the Crvena Zvezda basketball club in 1945. He held number 1 membership card.
He played for Crvena Zvezda from 1945 to 1951, he also coached men's team at Red Star from 1945 to 1955 and women's Red Star team from 1946 to 1952. In July 1950, he was a member of the Zvezda squad that won an international cup tournament in Milan, Italy.

Popović played for the Italian team Gallaratese in 1951–1952.

Yugoslavia national team
As a player for the Yugoslavia national basketball team Popović participated in 1950 World Championship and 1947 European Championship. He scored first point in history of World Championships as player of Yugoslavia.

He coached Yugoslavia national basketball team at the 1950 World Championship and 1953 European Championship.

Administrator 
Popović served as the president of the Yugoslav Basketball Federation (1985–1987) and president of the Commission for International Competition of FIBA.

Journalism 
Popović also worked as a journalist, contributing to La Gazzetta dello Sport for four decades.

He was the executive of Yugoslav Radio Television (JRT), the Yugoslav national TV channel. He covered four Summer Olympic Games with JRT.

Career achievements and awards 
 Yugoslav Men's League champion: 10 (with Crvena zvezda: 1946, 1947, 1948, 1949, 1950, 1951, 1952, 1953, 1954, 1955) as coach/player until 1951 and as coach only, until 1955.
 Yugoslav Women's League champion: 7 (with Crvena zvezda: 1946, 1947, 1948, 1949, 1950, 1951, 1952) 
 FIBA Order of Merit (1997), awarded by the FIBA
 Prize “Sports & Universality”, awarded by the International Olympic Committee

In popular culture 
 In 2015 Serbian sports drama We Will Be the World Champions Popović is portrayed by Strahinja Blažić and his wife Maja Bedeković is portrayed by Iva Babić.

Coaching record

Yugoslav First Men's Basketball League

Yugoslav Women's Basketball League

National team

See also 
 List of Red Star Belgrade basketball coaches
 Borislav Stanković
 Radomir Šaper
 Aleksandar Nikolić

References

External links 
 Na današnji dan: Rođen Nebojša Popović, mojacrvenazvezda.net
 Nebojša Popović - Zvezdin broj 1 za sva vremena

1923 births
2001 deaths
People from Irig, Serbia
1950 FIBA World Championship players
FIBA Hall of Fame inductees
KK Crvena zvezda players
KK Crvena zvezda head coaches
ŽKK Crvena zvezda coaches
Player-coaches
Serbian basketball executives and administrators
Serbian expatriate basketball people in Italy
Serbian journalists
Serbian men's basketball players
Serbian men's basketball coaches
Yugoslav men's basketball players
Yugoslav basketball coaches
20th-century journalists
1942 Belgrade Basketball Championship players